Mark R. Catano is a former American football nose tackle who played three seasons for two different teams, the Pittsburgh Steelers and the Buffalo Bills of the NFL. He played college football for Valdosta State.

References

1962 births
Living people
People from Yonkers, New York
Players of American football from New York (state)
American football defensive tackles
Valdosta State Blazers football players
Pittsburgh Steelers players
Buffalo Bills players